The South African Railways Class GO 4-8-2+2-8-4 of 1954 was an articulated steam locomotive.

In 1954, the South African Railways placed 25 Class GO light branch line tank-and-tender Garratt articulated steam locomotives with a  Double Mountain type wheel arrangement in service. It was the last new steam locomotive type to be acquired by the Railways.

Manufacturer

The Class GO 4-8-2+2-8-4 tank-and-tender Garratt locomotive was designed to operate on lighter rails. The designs were prepared in 1952 under the supervision of L.C. Grubb, the Chief Mechanical Engineer (CME) of the SAR from 1949 to 1954, and an order for 25 of these locomotives was placed with Henschel and Son in Germany. Their construction immediately followed that of the first batch of the Class GMA Garratt, which was built by the same manufacturer.

They were built in 1953 and were delivered and placed in service in 1954, numbered in the range from 2572 to 2596. The Class GO turned out to be the last new steam locomotive type to be acquired by the Railways before full-scale electrification and dieselisation commenced. The Class 5E mainline electric locomotive entered service a year after the Class GO and the Class 31-000 diesel-electric locomotive followed in 1958.

Characteristics
It was also superheated, with a mechanical stoker, Walschaerts valve gear and piston valves, and was built on an identical one-piece cast steel frame with Franklin spring-loaded wedge horns, manufactured by Commonwealth Steel Castings Corporation in the United States of America. The chief differences were aimed at reducing weight, such as a smaller boiler with a reduced diameter, a smaller firebox and firegrate area and a half ton smaller capacity coal bunker.

As a result of the smaller diameter boiler, the Class GO had a slightly longer chimney than the Class GMA. On the coal bunker, the reduced capacity involved altering the inverted "L" front end profile of the Class GMA bunker to a "\" profile on the Class GO bunker, as well as lowering the bunker height from more or less in line with the cab roof on the Class GMA to somewhat below the cab roofline on the Class GO.

It also had roller bearing axle boxes on all wheels, but not on the crank-pins, with cannon boxes on all axles, except those of the inner Bissel trucks which had outside bearings. It had mechanical lubrication throughout, self-adjusting pivots, a U-shaped foundation ring welded to the inner and outer firebox bottom edges, and an all-welded firebox. The engine units also had Commonwealth cast steel type frames..

Like the Classes GM and GMA, the Class GO was a tank-and-tender Garratt. As was done with the Class GM and Class GMA, the Class GO carried water only in its front tank, while the rear bunker carried only coal. The Class GO and the first batch of the Class GMA were both equipped with the second version of the Type X-17 water tender which was built in 1953. The tenders were numbered for their engines and were painted black with red buffer beams.

The most obvious visible differences between the Class GMA and Class GO were their coal bunker front ends, with the inverted "L" profile of the Class GMA and the "\" profile of the Class GO, and the longer chimney of the Class GO. On both locomotives, the engines for their mechanical stokers were situated in the cutout on the front or cabside ends of their coal bunkers, but on the right or driver's side on the Class GMA and on the left or stoker's side on the Class GO.

Service
Upon delivery, they were briefly put on trials on the line from Krugersdorp to Zeerust, after which they were relocated to the line from Belfast to Steelpoort in the Eastern Transvaal, shedded at Lydenburg.

When the Steelpoort line was dieselised in 1972, the locomotives went to work on the branch line from Umtata to Amabele in Transkei and on the Greytown branch line out of Pietermaritzburg in Natal. They were unpopular in Transkei, however, being too small to replace two Class 14CRB locomotives, while their coupled wheelbase per engine unit was longer than that of the Class 14CRB and therefore took less kindly to the sharp curves at the Kei River crossing.

As a result, the Transkei locomotives were soon also relocated to Natal, where most of them ended up on the North Coast line, shedded at Stanger, Empangeni and Gingindlovu. From Empangeni, they also worked the line to Golela on the Swaziland border and they also served briefly on the Eshowe and Nkwalini branch lines. They were soon withdrawn from the Eshowe branch, however, as a result of their tendency to start fires while climbing the 1 in 30 (3⅓%) gradients through sugar cane fields.

Like the Class GMA, the Class GO was a successful locomotive which gave good service. However, after they were displaced by diesel-electric locomotives, the whole Class was relocated to De Aar in 1977, where the locomotives spent seven years standing idle before they were abruptly all written off in 1984 after only 22 years of actual revenue service. None were sold into industrial service.

Preservation

Of the Class GO, only one survived into preservation. By 2018

Illustration
The main picture shows no. 2592 staged at the De Aar loco depot in 1979. The only preserved Class GO locomotive is no. 2575 which is on display at the Outeniqua Transport Museum in George.

References

2500
2500
4-8-2+2-8-4 locomotives
2D1+1D2 locomotives
Henschel locomotives
Garratt locomotives
Cape gauge railway locomotives
Railway locomotives introduced in 1954
1954 in South Africa